Sinkwa may refer to:

 The Swazi word for bread
 Sinkwa, Mogok, city in the Mogok Township, Burma

See also
Luffa acutangula, plant also known by name "sinkwa towelsponge" in English